Sydney H. Martin was a South African football player who played as an inside right for Huddersfield Town, Grimsby Town and Gillingham in the Football League.

References

Sportspeople from Durban
South African soccer players
Huddersfield Town A.F.C. players
Grimsby Town F.C. players
Gillingham F.C. players
English Football League players
Year of birth missing
Year of death missing
Association football inside forwards